Naalaaga Endaro (Many Are Like Me) is 1978 Telugu-language film directed by Eeranki Sharma. The film won seven Nandi Awards.

Soundtrack
 Anubhavalaku Adikavyam Aadadani Jeevitam (Lyrics: Acharya Aatreya)
 Kalyanini... Kanulunna Manasuku Kanipinchu Roopanni (Lyrics: Acharya Aatreya)

Awards
Nandi Awards - 1978
Best Feature Film - Gold - K. Prem Ranjith
Best Actor - Hema Sundar
Best Actress - Roopa
Best Music Director - M. S. Viswanathan
Best Male Playback Singer - S. P. Balasubrahmanyam
Best Female Playback Singer - P. Susheela
Second Best Story Writer - Ganesh Patro

References

1978 films
Indian drama films
Films scored by M. S. Viswanathan
1970s Telugu-language films
1978 drama films